The 2003–04 Georgia Tech Yellow Jackets men's basketball team represented Georgia Institute of Technology as a member of the Atlantic Coast Conference during the 2003–04 season. Led by fourth year head coach Paul Hewitt, the Yellow Jackets made their best finish to date in the NCAA Tournament, battling all the way to the national championship game, where they eventually fell to UConn.

Roster

Schedule and results

|-
!colspan=9 style=| Regular Season

|-
!colspan=9 style=| ACC Tournament

|-
!colspan=9 style=| NCAA Tournament

Sources

Rankings

References

Georgia Tech Yellow Jackets men's basketball seasons
Georgia Tech
Georgia Tech Yellow Jackets men's basketball team
Georgia Tech Yellow Jackets men's basketball team
Georgia Tech
NCAA Division I men's basketball tournament Final Four seasons